Rod O'Connor (born 11 January 1948) is  a former Australian rules footballer who played with Footscray in the Victorian Football League (VFL and Central Districts in the SANFL.

Notes

External links 		
		

Living people
1948 births
Australian rules footballers from Victoria (Australia)
Western Bulldogs players